Tony Hughes (born 31 December 1957 in Stockport, Cheshire) is a British businessman and former auto racing driver. He is the managing director of Hughes Safety Showers and drove for Speedworks Motorsport in the British Touring Car Championship in 2011 and 2012.

Racing career

Ginetta
Hughes started circuit racing in 2007, competing in the Ginetta G20 Cup for Speedworks Motorsport. The following year he progressed to the Ginetta G50 Cup where he raced for three years. He won the Chairman's Cup once in 2009 and three times in 2010. During the round at Snetterton he was involved in a heavy collision with the spinning car of Formula One engineer Adrian Newey who was competing as a guest driver.

British Touring Car Championship

For 2011 he stepped up to the British Touring Car Championship, competing NGTC Toyota Avensis for Speedworks. He finished 31st in the overall drivers' championship with a best race result of 14th at Oulton Park.

Hughes confirmed he would return to Speedworks for the 2012 season driving alongside 2011 Ginetta GT Supercup champion Adam Morgan. He finished the season 25th in the drivers' standings with a best result of twelfth at Oulton Park. At the end of the season he announced his retirement from motor racing although he would remain involved with the Speedworks team.

Racing record

Complete British Touring Car Championship results
(key) (Races in bold indicate pole position – 1 point awarded just in first race) (Races in italics indicate fastest lap – 1 point awarded all races) (* signifies that driver lead race for at least one lap – 1 point given all races)

References

External links
Official site
BTCC.net profile

Living people
English racing drivers
1957 births
British Touring Car Championship drivers
Ginetta GT4 Supercup drivers
24H Series drivers